The Upper Carniolan dialect group (gorenjska narečna skupina) is a group of closely related dialects of Slovene. The Upper Carniolan dialects are spoken in most of Upper Carniola and in Ljubljana.

Phonological and morphological characteristics
Among other features, this group is characterized by monophthongal stressed vowels, an acute semivowel, pitch accent, standard circumflex shift, and two accentual retractions with some exceptions. It features narrowing of o and e in preaccentual position, akanye (reduction of o to a) in postaccentual position, and strong syncope.

Individual dialects and subdialects
Upper Carniolan dialect (gorenjsko narečje, gorenjščina)
Eastern Upper Carniolan subdialect (vzhodnogorenjski govor, vzhodna gorenjščina)
Selca dialect (selško narečje, selščina)

References

Slovene dialects
Upper Carniola